To compete in the Professional Darts Corporation pro tour tournaments one needs a Tour card.

In total 128 players are granted Tour Cards, which enables them to participate in all Players Championships, UK Open Qualifiers and European Tour events.

A tour card is valid for 2 years. The top 64 in the PDC Order of Merit and some secondary tour winners and those who won card at Q-School in 2016 still had a valid card for 2017. 28 remaining places were played out at the 2017 Qualifying-School. All players who won a card there had their Order of Merit ranking reset to zero.

Players

See also
List of darts players
List of darts players who have switched organisation

References 

2017 PDC Pro Tour
2017 in darts
Lists of darts players